Blekinge County is one of the 29 multi-member constituencies of the Riksdag, the national legislature of Sweden. The constituency was established in 1970 when the Riksdag changed from a bicameral legislature to a unicameral legislature. It is conterminous with the county of Blekinge. The constituency currently elects five of the 349 members of the Riksdag using the open party-list proportional representation electoral system. At the 2022 general election it had 121,789 registered electors.

Electoral system
Blekinge County currently elects five of the 349 members of the Riksdag using the open party-list proportional representation electoral system. Constituency seats are allocated using the modified Sainte-Laguë method. Only parties that that reach the 4% national threshold and parties that receive at least 12% of the vote in the constituency compete for constituency seats. Supplementary leveling seats may also be allocated at the constituency level to parties that reach the 4% national threshold.

Election results

Summary

(Excludes leveling seats)

Detailed

2020s

2022
Results of the 2022 general election held on 11 September 2022:

The following candidates were elected:
 Constituency seats - Heléne Björklund (S), 2,227 votes; Camilla Brunsberg (M), 1,693 votes;  Ann-Christine From Utterstedt (SD), 0 votes; Richard Jomshof (SD), 181 votes; and Magnus Manhammar (S), 1,304 votes.

2010s

2018
Results of the 2018 general election held on 9 September 2018:

The following candidates were elected:
 Constituency seats - Angelika Bengtsson (SD), 5 votes; Heléne Björklund (S), 2,232 votes; Annicka Engblom (M), 1,501 votes; Richard Jomshof (SD), 252 votes; and Magnus Manhammar (S), 1,741 votes.

2014
Results of the 2014 general election held on 14 September 2014:

The following candidates were elected:
 Constituency seats - Annicka Engblom (M), 4,693 votes; Peter Jeppsson (S), 1,599 votes; Richard Jomshof (SD), 321 votes; Magnus Manhammar (S), 2,937 votes; and Suzanne Svensson (S), 783 votes.

2010
Results of the 2010 general election held on 19 September 2010:

The following candidates were elected:
 Constituency seats - Annicka Engblom (M), 2,554 votes; Kerstin Haglö (S), 827 votes; Peter Jeppsson (S), 1,426 votes; Gustav Nilsson (M), 700 votes; and Suzanne Svensson (S), 991 votes.
 Leveling seats - Jonas Åkerlund (SD), 17 votes.

2000s

2006
Results of the 2006 general election held on 17 September 2006:

The following candidates were elected:
 Constituency seats - Kerstin Andersson (S), 1,116 votes; Jan Björkman (S), 1,513 votes; Annicka Engblom (M), 1,866 votes; Peter Jeppsson (S), 1,470 votes; and Jeppe Johnsson (M), 2,632 votes.

2002
Results of the 2002 general election held on 15 September 2002:

The following candidates were elected:
 Constituency seats - Kerstin Andersson (S), 1,186 votes; Heli Berg (FP), 622 votes; Jan Björkman (S), 2,057 votes; Jeppe Johnsson (M), 2,514 votes; and Christer Skoog (S), 1,421 votes.
 Leveling seats - Johnny Gylling (KD), 1,372 votes.

1990s

1998
Results of the 1998 general election held on 20 September 1998:

The following candidates were elected:
 Constituency seats - Jan Björkman (S), 1,830 votes; Johnny Gylling (KD), 401 votes; Jeppe Johnsson (M), 2,150 votes;  (S), 790 votes; Christer Skoog (S), 1,267 votes; and Willy Söderdahl (V), 631 votes.

1994
Results of the 1994 general election held on 18 September 1994:

1991
Results of the 1991 general election held on 15 September 1991:

1980s

1988
Results of the 1988 general election held on 18 September 1988:

1985
Results of the 1985 general election held on 15 September 1985:

1982
Results of the 1982 general election held on 19 September 1982:

1970s

1979
Results of the 1979 general election held on 16 September 1979:

1976
Results of the 1976 general election held on 19 September 1976:

1973
Results of the 1973 general election held on 16 September 1973:

1970
Results of the 1970 general election held on 20 September 1970:

References

Riksdag constituency
Riksdag constituencies
Riksdag constituencies established in 1970